Granby High School (originally Granby Street High School) is a public high school in Norfolk, Virginia. The school is part of the Norfolk Public Schools system.  It is the only high school in the school division that offers an International Baccalaureate program. The school building is located on historic Granby Street where the south end is at Downtown Norfolk and the north end where the beaches of Ocean View lie. Granby is also less than a mile away from the historic Wards Corner, a local shopping and eating center. In 2010, Newsweek placed Granby in the top 1300 of "America's Top Public High Schools". Granby was the only school in Norfolk, VA to place on the list. Granby's mascot is the comet.

History
Opened in 1939, the school was previously known as Granby Street High School, reflecting the street on which it is located. Both the street and the school are named after John Manners, Marquess of Granby and Duke of Rutland, a hero of the Seven Years' War. The twenty-four acre tract on which Granby was built was once part of the Talbot Plantation before the property was donated to the city by Minton W. Talbot.

Blue, Gold, and Silver are the school colors. Blue representing the color of the Chesapeake Bay, which is in Granby's vicinity. The gold and silver are derived from the proverb: "A word fitly spoken is like apples of gold in pictures of silver." This quote is also hung on a plaque in the hallway.

Granby's school symbol is the comet. It also has a newspaper entitled "The Spectator," and annually publishes a literary magazine called "The Cupola," named after the structure on the top of the school's roof. The weathervane on top of the cupola was bent as a result of tropical storm Ernesto but was fixed within six months.

"Granby 1" and "Granby 2"
In 1996, the school system invested $21 million in a construction project in order to expand and renovate the 57-year-old building. Because of this construction, the entire student body could not stay in the original building. To fix this problem, the 1100 freshmen and sophomores were sent to the former Norfolk Catholic High building a half-mile away from the building. Catholic High was vacant at the time since Catholic High moved to Virginia Beach. The Catholic High building was nicknamed "Granby 2" while the original building was "Granby 1." Under Principal Michael Caprio, the school had to double everything including scheduling, busing, orientation, and lunches. Several headaches later, the  expansion was complete with a comprehensive voice, video, and high-speed data network and a media resource management system for 110 classrooms and laboratories. In addition, the building gained two multimedia presentation rooms and an innovative CCTV security system.

International Baccalaureate Program
Granby High School is the only high school in the Norfolk Public Schools system that offers the International Baccalaureate Program, or IB, abbreviated. Specifically known as the IB Diploma Program, the program is a two-year academically rigorous curriculum intended for juniors and seniors who desire in-depth scholastic preparation for college or university.

Sports at Granby High
Granby High School offers a variety of sports as it is a member of the AAA Eastern Region of the Virginia High School League. Comets compete in the AAA Eastern District which is composed of the five Norfolk high schools and the three Portsmouth high schools. The sports offered at Granby include:

Baseball, Junior Varsity
Baseball, Varsity
Basketball, Boys
Basketball, Girls
Basketball, Junior Varsity, Boys
Basketball, Junior Varsity, Girls
Cheerleader, Junior Varsity
Cheerleaders, Varsity
Crew
Cross Country
Field Hockey
Football
Golf
Sailing (combination of students from Granby, Matthew Fontaine Maury High School, and Saint Patrick Catholic School)
Soccer, Boys
Soccer, Girls
Softball
Softball Junior Varsity
Swimming, Boys
Swimming, Girls
Table tennis
Tennis, Boys
Tennis, Girls
Track, Indoor
Track, Outdoor
Volleyball, Boys
Volleyball, Girls

Wrestling—Wrestling coach Billy Martin's teams won 21 state titles in 22 seasons at Granby High from 1949 to 1970. In the decade of the 1960s, Granby lost only two matches. Martin's most famous invention was the "Granby roll", a move that used an opponent's aggressiveness against him. It became the basis of the "Granby System," which is still taught today. He was elected to the National Wrestling Hall of Fame in 1980, one of the first high school coaches inducted.

Granby Marching Comets

Granby High School is home to the Marching Comets, a drum-corps style marching band currently led by Mr. Joshua Stone, who have competed in the Tournament of Bands. Under the direction of Mr. Steve Clendenin, the Comets have traveled as far as Scranton, Pennsylvania to compete in the Atlantic Coast Championships (ACCs) with field shows titled "The Mask of Zorro" and "La Corrida de Torres." (The Bullfight) In 2006, the Marching Comets earned the title of Group II ACC Invitational Class Champions with "La Corrida de Torres."

Notable alumni

 John E. Blaha – astronaut
 Peter Blair – Olympic freestyle wrestler, competed at the 1956 Summer Olympics
 Levi Brown – former NFL offensive tackle
 Keyshawn Davis – Olympic Lightweight boxer, competed at the 2020 Summer Olympics
 Lefty Driesell – former college basketball coach
 Hank Foiles – former MLB catcher
 Grant Gustin – actor, played in shows Glee and The Flash
 Erika Renee Land – author
 Dexter Reid – former NFL safety and two-time Super Bowl champion
 Nick Rerras – former politician
 Chuck Stobbs – former MLB pitcher
 Scott Travis – Grammy award winning American rock musician, drummer 
 R. Steven Whitcomb – 63rd Inspector General of the United States Army
 Terrance Woodbury – professional basketball player

Notable former teachers and staff
 Bob Tata – retired long-time member of the Virginia House of Delegates, coached football at Granby

See also
Granby Street
John Manners, Marquess of Granby

References

External links
 
Norfolk Public Schools

Educational institutions established in 1939
Schools in Norfolk, Virginia
Public high schools in Virginia
International Baccalaureate schools in Virginia
1939 establishments in Virginia